David Wayne Hoilett Jr. (born 5 June 1990), known as Junior Hoilett, is a Canadian professional soccer player who plays as a winger for EFL Championship club Reading and the Canada national team.

After impressing in a youth tournament, Hoilett signed for English club Blackburn Rovers at the age of 13, and was loaned to SC Paderborn and FC St. Pauli in the German 2. Bundesliga due to work permit issues. He made his Rovers debut in 2009 and played three full Premier League seasons for them before a transfer to Queens Park Rangers in 2012. Hoilett spent four years at the Loftus Road club – alternately in the Premier League and Championship – before moving to Cardiff on the expiration of his contract. In his second season with Cardiff, he helped the side win promotion to the Premier League by finishing as Championship runners-up during the 2017–18 season.

Hoilett made his senior international debut for Canada in 2015. He was part of their squad at the CONCACAF Gold Cup in 2017, 2019 and 2021, reaching the semi-finals at the last of those tournaments.

Early life
Hoilett was born in Brampton, Ontario, one of four children to David and Ingrid Hoilett. Both of his parents are of Jamaican descent, with his father hailing from Ocho Rios. His father previously worked as a DJ and music promoter. He has described his upbringing as "a very sporty childhood", playing against his three siblings in numerous sports. Hoilett played both baseball and basketball at youth level before settling on association football at age 11. His younger brother Jaineil also became a footballer, playing in Germany at amateur level. He played youth soccer in Canada with Brampton Youth SC, CS Azzurri, and Oakville SC. He travelled the world with his club and gained attention at a tournament in Wales; he turned down an extended trial with Manchester United to join Blackburn Rovers as he believed he had more chance of breaking into the first team at the latter. After taking a year to make the decision to move to England, Hoilett signed for Rovers in 2003. After moving to England, he attended St Bede's Roman Catholic High School in Blackburn.

Club career
He progressed through Blackburn's youth system before signing his first contract at the age of 16. However, he suffered a setback when he was initially unable to earn a work permit to play in the United Kingdom. In order to qualify for one in future, Blackburn looked to loan Hoilett to a club in another European country, with the player rejecting possible moves to Belgium and France.

Hoilett eventually agreed to a loan move to Germany, joining SC Paderborn. He made his senior debut for the club against Kickers Offenbach, coming on as a substitute for Sven Lintjens in a 3–2 victory on 3 February 2008, aged 17. Hoilett's first match in the starting eleven was against 1899 Hoffenheim on 9 March 2008.

Hoilett scored his only goal of his loan campaign on 18 May 2008, against Borussia Mönchengladbach in what would be his final game for the club. Paderborn were later relegated, ending the 2007–08 2. Bundesliga season in 17th position.

Hoilett was loaned to another German club in the 2. Bundesliga, FC St. Pauli, for the 2008–09 2. Bundesliga season. He made his debut for the Hamburg-based side against Greuther Fürth on 22 August 2008. He scored six times during his loan campaign with braces against Alemannia Aachen and Hansa Rostock, as well as individual goals against 1860 Munich and 1. FC Kaiserslautern. His final game would come in the form of a 1–0 loss against Rot Weiss Ahlen on 3 May 2009. St. Pauli finished the season in eighth place.

Blackburn Rovers

In January 2009, Hoilett's home club Blackburn again applied for him to receive a work permit for him to play football in England. In the summer of 2009, Hoilett was granted a work permit on appeal, allowing him to continue his fledgling career in England at the Premier League level with Blackburn. Blackburn chose not to send him to a third loan spell in Germany, rejecting an approach from Mainz 05.

After impressing during the club's pre-season schedule, Hoilett made his debut for Blackburn in the opening day of the 2009–10 season as a late substitute in place of El Hadji Diouf during a 2–0 defeat to Manchester City. He was named in the starting line-up for the team's following match and scored his first competitive goal for Rovers in a 3–1 League Cup win over Gillingham on 25 August 2009. His performances in the early stages of the campaign prompted the club to open talks over a contract extension as Hoilett was in the final year of his original deal. Hoilett was involved in Blackburn's dramatic League Cup win against Chelsea on 2 December 2009. Coming on as a second half substitution, he won a stoppage time penalty which Benni McCarthy converted to put Rovers 3–2 up, before Paulo Ferreira equalised in the 122nd minute. However, Hoilett converted the fifth penalty to help Rovers to a 4–3 shoot-out win and a place in the semi-finals. He then started his first league match on 12 December against Hull City, playing the full 90 minutes in a 0–0 draw at the KC Stadium. On 25 February 2010, with his contract due to expire in June 2010, Hoilett ended speculation regarding his future at the club, by signing a new two-and-a-half-year deal with Blackburn, keeping him at the club until the summer of 2012. He finished the season having made 27 appearances in all competitions, scoring once.

Hoilett made his first Premier League appearance of the 2010–11 season on 21 August 2010, coming on for Nikola Kalinić in the 84th minute in a 2–1 defeat at St Andrew's against Birmingham City.

Hoilett scored his first goal of the 2010–11 season in the 1–0 victory over Queens Park Rangers in the FA Cup third round.

Hoilett scored his first league goal on 23 January 2011, in a 2–0 home victory against West Bromwich Albion at Ewood Park, converting in the 47th minute from a Nikola Kalinić assist. On 12 February 2011, he made his fortieth Premier League appearance for Blackburn when he featured against Newcastle United in a goalless draw, and was replaced at half-time due to a slight hamstring strain by Morten Gamst Pedersen. On 5 March, he scored his third goal of the season in a 3–2 defeat against Fulham in the 65th minute, away at Craven Cottage. He was replaced by debutant Rubén Rochina after 82 minutes. Hoilett's next goal came in the following game, a last gasp equaliser from a header against Blackpool in a 2–2 home draw. On 9 April 2011, Hoilett scored in the 1–1 draw against Birmingham City before half time, but was unfortunately injured in the 68th minute, being replaced by Australian Brett Emerton.

Hoilett scored his fifth league goal of the campaign with an individual effort, coming in a 3–2 win against Wolverhampton Wanderers at Molineux Stadium on the last day of the season. On 11 September 2011, in a game between Blackburn and Fulham, he was involved in a collision with Mark Schwarzer which resulted in a head injury for Hoilett. He was eventually stretchered off and Schwarzer received a yellow card.
Hoilett scored Blackburn's controversial second goal in their 3–3 draw with Wigan Athletic, after teammate Morten Gamst Pedersen seemed to dribble the ball straight from a corner before firing in a low cross for Hoilett to head home from two yards.

In January 2012, Hoilett was named one of the thirteen players to watch in 2012 by world football governing body FIFA.

In the 2011–12 season, Hoilett had the most dribbles per game among all Premier League players.

Queens Park Rangers

After refusing a contract renewal with Blackburn Rovers, Hoilett joined Queens Park Rangers on 27 July 2012, for a fee decided by tribunal. He signed a four-year contract. He scored his first goal for QPR in a 2–3 League Cup defeat to Reading on 26 September 2012. On 2 March 2013, Hoilett set-up teammate Loïc Rémy and played a crucial part in a 2–1 win over Southampton. A combination of injuries and poor form meant that Hoilett had a frustrating first season at QPR, which resulted in relegation to the Championship.

Hoilett scored his first goal of the 2013–14 Championship season in a 1–1 draw with Huddersfield Town. Four months later, he scored his second goal of the season in a comfortable 3–0 win over AFC Bournemouth at Loftus Road. In QPR's 1–0 victory over Derby County at Wembley Stadium in the Championship play-off final, Hoilett grabbed an assist for the only goal of the game, when he crossed for Bobby Zamora to score in the 89th minute, as QPR gained promotion back to the Premier League after an absence of one season. After failing to agree a new contract with QPR at the end of the 2015–16 season, Hoilett left the club following the expiry of his current deal.

Cardiff City
Following the appointment of Neil Warnock as manager, Hoilett signed with Cardiff City on 6 October 2016, becoming Warnock's first signing at the club. His debut came on 14 October, against severnside rivals Bristol City. Hoilett scored his first goal for Cardiff during a 3–2 victory over Huddersfield Town on 19 November 2016. He went on to score one more goal before signing a one-year contract extension in May 2017.

The 2017–18 season saw Hoilett's most productive campaign, finishing the season with twelve goals, including scoring against former club Queens Park Rangers, and notching a brace against Mansfield Town in the FA Cup, as Cardiff finished second, gaining promotion to the Premier League. Hoilett was offered a new contract following the club promotion.

On 26 June 2018, Hoilett signed a three-year contract in the Welsh capital. He scored his first Premier League goal since 2012 in a 2–1 comeback win over Wolverhampton Wanderers on 30 November, which BBC Sport called a "fabulous first-time effort from 25 yards".

On 9 May 2021, Hoilett announced his departure from Cardiff City at the end of his contract via Instagram. He had spent five years with the club, amassing 184 appearances across all competitions. His last appearance for the club came on 27 January against Barnsley in the first game in charge for new manager Mick McCarthy, but he didn't feature at all the rest of the season.

Reading
On 19 August 2021, Hoilett signed for Reading on a one-year contract. His first goal for the club came at the Cardiff City Stadium on 2 October, the only goal in a win over his former club. In July 2022 Hoilett re-signed with Reading on another one-year deal. During the 2022-23 season Hoilett began featuring at wing-back for the club, earning praise for his performances by coach Paul Ince, heralding him as "unplayable."

International career
As a child, Hoilett captained Canada's team at the 2001 Danone Nations Cup in Paris.

Hoilett was eligible to play for either Canada or Jamaica at international level. In February 2011, he rejected a call-up from the Canada national team, stating that he wanted more time to develop his club career before committing to international football. In January 2012, Jamaica Football Federation president Horace Burrell confirmed that he had approached the player's father about Hoilett representing Jamaica, with his father keen for him to represent the Caribbean nation. In March 2012, Hoilett told various media bodies that he would consider playing for England if eligible.

Hoilett officially declared for Canada in September 2015, prior to the fourth round of CONCACAF 2018 World Cup Qualifying. He received his first international cap in a 1–1 draw against Ghana on 13 October 2015, at RFK Stadium in Washington, D.C. He officially got cap-tied to Canada after starting for the nation in a 2018 World Cup qualification match against Honduras. Hoilett was named to Canada's squad for the 2017 CONCACAF Gold Cup on 27 June 2017, and scored his first international goal in the quarter-finals on 20 July, in a 1–2 defeat to eventual finalists Jamaica.

Hoilett was named to the final 23-man squad for the 2019 CONCACAF Gold Cup on 20 May 2019. He scored in victories over Martinique and Cuba – each breaking the record for the country's biggest win in the competition – as the Canadians advanced to the quarter-finals. Hoilett was named Canada's captain for the first time in a CONCACAF Nations League match against Cuba on 7 September 2019; he scored three goals in a 6–0 victory. In doing so, Hoilett became the third Canadian player in 2019 to net a hat-trick against Cuba, following Jonathan David and Lucas Cavallini.

Hoilett was called-up to Canada's squad for the 2021 CONCACAF Gold Cup on 1 July. He scored in a 4–1 group win over Haiti and a 2–0 quarter-final win over Costa Rica as the team reached the semi-finals for the first time since 2007.

Hoilett scored the third goal on 27 March 2022 as Canada defeated Jamaica 4–0 in 2022 FIFA World Cup qualification, thereby making the World Cup for the first time since 1986. In November 2022, Hoilett was named to Canada’s 26-man squad for the 2022 FIFA World Cup.

Career statistics

Club

International

Scores and results list Canada's goal tally first, score column indicates score after each Hoilett goal.

Honours
Queens Park Rangers
Football League Championship play-offs: 2014

Cardiff City
EFL Championship runner-up: 2017–18

Individual
BBC Goal of the Month: November 2018

References

External links

1990 births
Living people
Canadian soccer players
Soccer players from Brampton
Black Canadian soccer players
Canadian sportspeople of Jamaican descent
Association football wingers
Canada men's international soccer players
2017 CONCACAF Gold Cup players
2019 CONCACAF Gold Cup players
2021 CONCACAF Gold Cup players
2022 FIFA World Cup players
Blackburn Rovers F.C. players
SC Paderborn 07 players
FC St. Pauli players
Queens Park Rangers F.C. players
Cardiff City F.C. players
Reading F.C. players
Premier League players
2. Bundesliga players
English Football League players
Canadian expatriate soccer players
Canadian expatriate sportspeople in England
Expatriate footballers in England
Canadian expatriate sportspeople in Germany
Expatriate footballers in Germany
Canadian expatriate sportspeople in Wales
Expatriate footballers in Wales